is member of Japanese idol group Sakurazaka46. She is represented by Sony Music Records.

Career 
On August 21, 2015, Habu along with 22 other members were announced for the newly created idol group, Toriizaka46 (now Sakurazaka46). Habu made her musical debut with Keyakizaka46's first single, Silent Majority. As of February 2019, she has participated in all eight of Keyakizaka46's singles.

Habu's modeling career started when she was featured on GirlsAward 2016 Spring/Summer, becoming the first Keyakizaka46 member to get on a runway show. In April 2018, she became an exclusive model for fashion magazine JJ along with Nogizaka46 member Hina Higuchi. The two were featured on the July edition cover the same year.

Discography

References

External links 
Mizuho Habu's page on Keyakizaka46's website

1997 births
Living people
Japanese female models
Japanese idols
Keyakizaka46 members
Musicians from Tokyo
Sakurazaka46 members